The Chocolate Girl  (French: La petite chocolatière) is a 1927 French silent film directed by René Hervil and starring Dolly Davis, Simone Mareuil and Luitz-Morat. It is based on the play of the same name by Paul Gavault, which has been made into several films.

Cast
 Dolly Davis as Benjamine Lapistolle  
 Simone Mareuil as Rosette  
 Luitz-Morat as Félicien Bedarride  
 André Roanne as Paul Normand  
 André Nicolle as Lapistolle - un riche chocolatier  
 Madame Pawloff as Florise Mingassol  
 Nita Alvarez 
 Ernest Maupain as Mingassol

References

Bibliography 
 Philippe Rège. Encyclopedia of French Film Directors, Volume 1. Scarecrow Press, 2009.

External links 
 

1927 films
French silent films
1920s French-language films
Films directed by René Hervil
French black-and-white films
1920s French films